{{DISPLAYTITLE:C36H53N7O6}}
The molecular formula C36H53N7O6 (molar mass: 679.85 g/mol, exact mass: 679.4057 u) may refer to:

 Difelikefalin
 Telaprevir

Molecular formulas